O Rebu (Literally English: The Fuss, International Title: The Party) is a Brazilian late night telenovela written by George Moura and Sérgio Goldenberg (based on Bráulio Pedroso's original story) and directed by José Luiz Villamarim. O Rebu'''s plot is loosely based on the 1974 telenovela of the same name, featuring an innovative narrative: the whole story takes place in 24 hours.

The series premiered on Monday, July 14, 2014 on a special time at 10:30 p.m. (BRT/AMT) on Rede Globo.

A total of 36 episodes of 35 minutes were produced. O Rebu aired 4 episodes per week, Monday to Friday (minus Wednesday due to the 2014 Football season games broadcast) at 11:15 p.m. (BRT/AMT).

Patrícia Pillar, Tony Ramos, Sophie Charlotte and Daniel de Oliveira star as the protagonists, while Cássia Kis and José de Abreu star as the antagonists.

 Plot 
A luxurious reception is interrupted when a body is found floating in the pool. One thing is certain: the murderer is among the high society guests. The businesswoman Angela Mahler (Patrícia Pillar) is the party hostess celebrating her recent business success. She shares the spotlight with Duda (Sophie Charlotte), her “daughter at heart”, and the contractor Braga (Tony Ramos), her business partner and nemesis.

The celebratory mood is threatened by the arrival of Bruno (Daniel de Oliveira), an ambitious young man who became involved with Duda in order to gain access to confidential information from Angela's and Braga's companies—he knows he can use his power over her to achieve whatever he wants.

The guests have their own issues to solve as well such as betrayals, secrets, and cunning moves. The event ends up bringing enemies together under the same roof, like a powder keg ready to explode.

All of a sudden, Bruno's body is found, and what was once a party quickly becomes the scene of a despicable crime. Thus begins a frantic search for the murderer in an investigation led by the police officer Pedroso (Marcos Palmeira) and Rosa (Dira Paes), his right-hand woman. Trapped in the house and under the investigators’ crosshairs, all the guests are suspects. Who could be behind this mystery?

 Cast 

 Ratings 
Aired in the 11 pm time slot in Brazil, The Party'' was seen by 24 million people. In the last month in which the miniseries aired, more than one million mentions were recorded on a social network. The show also hit the small screens in Portugal (SIC) and was among the top 20 most watched programs in the country.

Broadcast

References

External links 
 
 

2014 telenovelas
Brazilian telenovelas
TV Globo telenovelas
2014 Brazilian television series debuts
2014 Brazilian television series endings
Brazilian thriller television series
Portuguese-language telenovelas
Television shows set in Rio de Janeiro (city)